Jílovice may refer to places in the Czech Republic:

 Jílovice (České Budějovice District), a municipality and village in the South Bohemian Region
 Jílovice (Hradec Králové District), a municipality and village in the Hradec Králové Region
 Dolní Jílovice, a village and administrative part of Vyšší Brod in the South Bohemian Region